Ignore This is the third studio album from Swedish singer Salem Al Fakir, released in 2010.

Track listing

Charts

Weekly charts

Year-end charts

References

External links

 
  Planet Salem: the international Salem Al Fakir fansite

2010 albums
Salem Al Fakir albums